Correlation function may refer to:

 Correlation function, correlation between random variables at two different points in space or time
 Correlation function (quantum field theory), matrix element computed by inserting a product of operators between two states
 Correlation function (statistical mechanics), measure of the order in a system
 Correlation function (astronomy), distribution of galaxies in the universe